Gap – Tallard Airport  is an airport located in Tallard,  south-southwest of Gap, both communes in the Hautes-Alpes department of the Provence-Alpes-Côte d'Azur region in southeastern France.

Facilities
The primary runway is designated 03/21 and has a paved surface which measures .

Statistics

References

External links
 

Airports in Provence-Alpes-Côte d'Azur
Hautes-Alpes
Airports established in 1930